Peugeot  is a French manufacturer of scooters and small motorcycles. It is the largest manufacturer of scooters in Europe.

History

Peugeot built their first motorcycle in 1898 with a De Dion-Bouton engine mounted on the rear wheel. This model was shown at the 1898 Paris Exhibition but was not put into production. Peugeot did produce a tricycle in 1898 although most of the machine was actually manufactured by De Dion-Bouton.

In 1900 Peugeot started to manufacture quadricycles but these fell out of favor and ceased to be produced by 1903. In 1901, spurred on by the success of the French built Werner Brothers and Company Motobicyclette, Peugeot produced their own motorcycle using a Swiss made Zürcher and Lüthi (ZL) engine. The Peugeot 500 M, a  dual overhead camshaft model appeared in 1914, the first of this type. In 1930, Peugeot absorbed Automoto which had been a pioneer in the field of motorcycles and scooters. Peugeot was the leading French motorcycle manufacturer until the 1950s producing many models.

In June 1981 an agreement was signed with Honda which provided for the purchase of Japanese two-
stroke engines, variator transmission and electrical components to be installed in the Peugeot scooter.

In 1983 the new Peugeot SC was officially presented, the first scooter with plastic body of the French company equipped with a 50 and 80 cm³ two-stroke Honda engines and automatic gearbox; this mechanism derives from the Honda Lead (NH), produced in Japan from the previous year. The alliance with Honda will continue throughout the nineties, in fact the Japanese engines will also be used on the next Peugeot SV scooter, heir to the previous SC. In 2000 Peugeot will also market the Honda Foresight 250 scooter (produced in Atessa by Honda Industriale Italia) under its own brand as Peugeot SV 250.

On October 28, 2006, the "Jinan Qingqi Peugeot Motorcycle" was founded, a 50-50 joint venture between Peugeot Motocycle and Jinan Qingqi for the production of scooters in a new complex in Jinan intended for mainly European exports. The first models produced in China were the Peugeot 103 “Vogue” and the Kisbee, Citystar and V-Click scooters. Subsequently, the production of the Ludix and Django models was started.

In 2008 an agreement was signed with Sanyang Industry (SYM) for the production of scooters from 2009. This agreement provides for the supply of SYM technologies to Peugeot, specifically the Peugeot Tweet and LXR models are launched which are strictly derived respectively from the Taiwanese models SYM Symphony and SYM HD produced in China by SYM. The differences between the Taiwanese and French models are in a few design elements.

In December 2012, the Dannemarie engine plant where the 50 and 125 engines were manufactured was closed. Part of the production was relocated to China at the Jinan plant of the Qingqi-Peugeot Motocycles joint venture.

In October 2014, Mahindra and Mahindra acquired a 51% controlling stake in the company. PSA Group kept 49% stake in the company as well as the use of its brand image.

Peugeot currently produces scooters and 3-wheelers with engines ranging from 50 to 500cc. It operates 2 production sites at Mandeure, France and Jinan, China. Peugeot scooters are sold in 60 countries.

M&M subsequently acquired a 100% stake in 2019.

In November 2022, Munich-based private equity firm Mutares acquired 50 % equity of the company. This will give the German company 80 % controlling stake in Peugeot Motocycles.

Past and present models

Mopeds
 Peugeot 101 
 Peugeot 102
 Peugeot 103, produced from 1972, with different models (LSMs, SP, Land, Chrono, Electronics, TLX, RCX, Clip, Vogue, FXR, CRX, TSM and others)

Scooters

 Peugeot S55
 Peugeot S57
 Peugeot SC/SX
 Peugeot ST
 Peugeot Rapido
 Peugeot SV
 Peugeot Buxy
 Peugeot Speedake
 Peugeot Squab
 Peugeot Scoot'Elec
 Peugeot Speedfight
 Peugeot Elyseo
 Peugeot Elystar (50cc, 125cc, 150cc)
 Peugeot Looxor
 Peugeot JetForce
 Peugeot Ludix
 Peugeot Satelis
 Peugeot Satelis Compressor
 Peugeot Sum Up
 Peugeot Tweet
 Peugeot Vivacity
 Peugeot Kisbee
 Peugeot Citystar
 Peugeot e-Vivacity
 Peugeot Metropolis 400
 Peugeot Streetzone
 Peugeot e-Streetzone
 Peugeot Django
 Peugeot Sum-Up 125
 Peugeot Belville
 Peugeot Pulsion 125

Motorcycles

 Peugeot 500 M
 Peugeot TLX
 Peugeot XP6
 Peugeot XPS 
 Peugeot XR6
 Peugeot XR7

Motorsports

A Peugeot-engined Norton motorcycle ridden by Rem Fowler won the twin-cylinder class of the inaugural 1907 Isle of Man TT races.

Peugeot returned to top-level motorcycle racing in 2016 via a Moto3 project in collaboration with parent company Mahindra. In 2016 Peugeot MC Saxoprint fielded two Mahindra-based Peugeot MGP3Os for John McPhee and Alexis Masbou. Albert Arenas joined the team for the 2nd half of the season as a replacement for Masbou. McPhee took his, and Peugeot's, first Grand Prix win in wet conditions at Brno. In Australia, McPhee crashed while running in third place and was run over by Andrea Migno who was running right behind him. The race was red flagged and McPhee was taken to hospital where he was diagnosed with concussion, a broken thumb and a punctured lung. The injuries meant McPhee missed the final 2 races of the season. Hafiq Azmi replace him in Malaysia and  Vicente Pérez replace him in Valencia

In 2017 Patrik Pulkkinen and Jakub Kornfeil rode for the team. At the end of the 2017 season both Peugeot and Mahindra withdrew from motorcycle grand prix. The decision to withdraw was made so that the Mahindra Group could increase its focus on the FIA Formula E Championship.

Grand Prix motorcycle results

References

External links

 Peugeot  website
 Peugeot Scooters

Motorcycle manufacturers of France
Motocycles
Vehicle manufacturing companies established in 1898
1898 establishments in France
French brands
Mahindra Group